Barrino may refer to the following people:
Fantasia Barrino (born 1984), American R&B singer, songwriter, and actress
Ricco Barrino, American R&B recording artist and songwriter, brother of Fantasia
The Barrino Brothers, Nathaniel, Perry, and Julius Barrino, an American soul music group
Jamarl Barrino, (kwayjaye) is an American music artist from Charlotte, North Carolina